5th & Missouri is a St. Louis MetroLink station. It is located in downtown East St. Louis, Illinois and primarily serves as a MetroBus transfer and commuter station featuring 322 park and ride spaces.

Station layout

References

External links 
 St. Louis Metro
Station from Old Missouri Avenue from Google Maps Street View

St. Clair County Transit District
MetroLink stations in St. Clair County, Illinois
Railway stations in the United States opened in 1993
Red Line (St. Louis MetroLink)
Blue Line (St. Louis MetroLink)